The following is a list of football/rugby stadiums in Georgia, ordered by capacity. Currently all stadiums with a capacity of 1,000 or more are included.

Main Stadiums

More Stadiums

Under construction

See also
 List of European stadiums by capacity
 List of association football stadiums by capacity

References
 Stadiums in Georgia, cafe.daum.net/stade. 

 
Georgia
Stadiums
Football stadiums